The Third Department (3PLA) of the People's Liberation Army Joint Staff Department is responsible for China's military computer network operations (CNO) and signals intelligence (SIGINT) operations. It is the Chinese equivalent of the United States' National Security Agency or British GCHQ.

3PLA oversees an extensive network of SIGINT stations throughout China that collect and process intelligence. 3PLA has a large staff of linguists and technicians and is the largest Chinese intelligence agency. Subsequently, 3PLA and 4PLA are the two largest players in China's CNO. They share several responsibilities: cyber intelligence collection, R&D on information security, and the joint management of network attack and defense training systems. 4PLA's offensive mission is the key differentiator between 3PLA and 4PLA. The INEW doctrine consolidates this offensive mission under 4PLA, while 3PLA is left responsible for intelligence gathering and network defense. The personnel at 3PLA are also a key differentiator, since there is no indication that 4PLA has the analysis capabilities that 3PLA possesses, suggesting that 3PLA may analyze and exploit the cyber information that 4PLA gathers in their offensive missions. One interesting point is the importance of understanding adversary's “red lines” when conducting offensive IW actions to avoid unintended escalation, including assessments on how dependent opponents are on a single network node or a specific network. 3PLA or another PLA intelligence organization may provide these assessments and inform 4PLA operations.

See also 
Intelligence Bureau of the Joint Staff Department (2PLA)
Fourth Department of the Joint Staff Department (4PLA)

References  

People's Liberation Army